Fusiturricula iole is a species of sea snail, a marine gastropod mollusk in the family Drilliidae.

Description
The size of an adult shell varies between 20 mm and 35 mm.

Distribution
This species occurs in the demersal zone of the Caribbean Sea off Venezuela and Trinidad

It has also been found as a fossil in Pliocene strata of the Bowden Formation (Jamaica); age range: 3.6 to 2.588 Ma

References

 W. P. Woodring. 1928. Miocene Molluscs from Bowden, Jamaica. Part 2: Gastropods and discussion of results . Contributions to the Geology and Palaeontology of the West Indies

External links
 

iole
Gastropods described in 1928